Patrick Sebastian Dinu (born 12 June 2005) is a Romanian competitive swimmer specializing in sprint freestyle events. At the 2022 World Junior Championships, he won a gold medal in the 4×100-metre freestyle relay, a silver medal in the 4×100-metre mixed freestyle relay, and placed fifth in the final of the 100-metre freestyle. He is a gold medalist in the 4×100-metre freestyle relay at the European Junior Championships in 2022 and silver medalist in 2021, as well as a silver medalist in the 4×100-metre mixed freestyle relay and in 2022.

Background
Dinu was born 12 June 2005 and started competitive swimming at six years of age as part of the Atena Sport Club Constanța. He is coached by Olympian, and fellow Romanian, Răzvan Florea and trains with and competes for CS Farul Constanța.

Career

2021–2022
As part of the 4×100-metre freestyle relay at the 2021 European Junior Swimming Championships, held in July in Rome, Italy, Dinu swam a time of 51.04 seconds for the anchor leg of the relay, contributing to a final time of 3:19.93, and helping win the silver medal. In his other events at the Championships, he placed 31st in the 100-metre freestyle with a 51.45, 42nd in the 50-metre breaststroke with a time of 30.04 seconds, and 51st in the 50-metre freestyle with a 24.08. The following year, he lowered his split time in the 4×100-metre freestyle relay to a 49.72 at the 2022 European Junior Swimming Championships, held in July in Otopeni, helping win the gold medal with a final time of 3:18.93. In the 4×100-metre mixed freestyle relay, he won a silver medal, splitting a 50.03 for the second leg of the relay to help finish second in a Romanian record time of 3:29.35. In the 100-metre freestyle, he placed tenth in the semifinals with a time of 50.72 seconds and in the 50-metre freestyle, he placed 26th with a time of 23.50 seconds.

2022 European Aquatics Championships
For the 2022 European Aquatics Championships, with pool swimming competition held in August at Foro Italico in Rome, Italy, Dinu qualified to compete in both the 100-metre freestyle individual event and the 4×100-metre freestyle relay. In the preliminary heats of the 100-metre freestyle on the second day of competition, he placed 53rd overall with a time of 50.59 seconds and did not advance to the semifinals. Two days later, he helped place eleventh in the 4×100-metre freestyle relay, contributing a split time of 50.20 seconds for the third leg of the relay to the final time of 3:17.94.

2022 World Junior Championships

At the 2022 FINA World Junior Swimming Championships, held in August and September 2022 in Lima, Peru, Dinu entered to compete in two individual events, the 50-metre freestyle and the 100-metre freestyle, and Romania announced relay teams for the 4×100-metre freestyle relay and 4×100-metre mixed freestyle relay. On the first day of competition, he split a 49.50 for the anchor leg of the 4×100-metre freestyle relay in the final, helping finish first in a time of 3:18.84 to win the gold medal. Two days later, he placed fourteenth in the semifinals of the 50-metre freestyle with a time of 23.41 seconds after swimming a personal best time of 23.31 seconds in the preliminary heats. In his second event of the day, the 4×100-metre mixed freestyle relay, he contributed a split time of 50.17 seconds for the second leg of the relay, helping win the silver medal in a time of 3:30.39. For his final event, he placed fifth in the final of the 100-metre freestyle on the sixth and final day of competition with a personal best time of 50.09 seconds, finishing 2.96 seconds behind gold medalist and fellow Romanian David Popovici after advancing to the final from the semifinals with a time of 50.22 seconds.

International championships (50 m)

Personal best times

Long course metres (50 m pool)

National records

Long course metres (50 m pool)

References

External links
 

2005 births
Living people
Sportspeople from Constanța
Romanian male freestyle swimmers